Richard or Dick Curtis may refer to:

Richard Curtis (born 1956), British screenwriter
Richard Curtis (politician) (born 1959), American politician
Richard Curteys (c. 1532–1582), English bishop (archaic spelling of Curtis)
Dick Curtis (1902–1952), American actor
Dick Curtis (boxer) (1802–1843), English boxing pioneer
Rick Curtis, musician and co-writer of Southern Cross (Crosby, Stills and Nash song)

See also
Curtis (surname)